The Clydesdale is a Scottish breed of draught horse. It is named for its area of origin, the Clydesdale or valley of the River Clyde, much of which is within the county of Lanarkshire.

The origins of the breed lie in the eighteenth century, when Flemish stallions were imported to Scotland and mated with local mares; in the nineteenth century, Shire blood was introduced. The first recorded use of the name "Clydesdale" for the breed was in 1826; the horses spread through much of Scotland and into northern England. After the breed society was formed in 1877, thousands of Clydesdales were exported to many countries of the world, particularly to Australia and New Zealand. In the early twentieth century numbers began to fall, both because many were taken for use in the First World War, and because of the increasing mechanisation of agriculture. By the 1970s, the Rare Breeds Survival Trust considered the breed vulnerable to extinction. Numbers have since increased slightly.

It is a large and powerful horse, although now not as heavy as in the past. It was traditionally used for draught power, both in farming and in road haulage. It is now principally a carriage horse. It may be ridden or driven in parades or processions; some have been used as drum horses by the Household Cavalry, while in the United States the Anheuser-Busch brewery uses a matched team of eight for publicity.

History 

The Clydesdale takes its name from Clydesdale, the old name for Lanarkshire, noted for the River Clyde. In the mid-18th century, Flemish stallions were imported to Scotland and bred to local mares, resulting in foals that were larger than the existing local stock. These included a black unnamed stallion imported from England by a John Paterson of Lochlyloch and an unnamed dark-brown stallion owned by the Duke of Hamilton.

Another prominent stallion was a  coach horse stallion of unknown lineage named Blaze. Written pedigrees were kept of these foals beginning in the early nineteenth century, and in 1806, a filly, later known as "Lampits mare" after the farm name of her owner, was born that traced her lineage to the black stallion. This mare is listed in the ancestry of almost every Clydesdale living today. One of her foals was Thompson's Black Horse (known as Glancer), which was to have a significant influence on the Clydesdale breed.

The first recorded use of the name "Clydesdale" in reference to the breed was in 1826 at an exhibition in Glasgow. Another theory of their origin, that of them descending from Flemish horses brought to Scotland as early as the 15th century, was also promulgated in the late 18th century. However, even the author of that theory admitted that the common story of their ancestry is more likely.

A system of hiring stallions between districts existed in Scotland, with written records dating back to 1837. This programme consisted of local agriculture improvement societies holding breed shows to choose the best stallion, whose owner was then awarded a monetary prize. The owner was then required, in return for additional monies, to take the stallion throughout a designated area, breeding to the local mares. Through this system and by purchase, Clydesdale stallions were sent throughout Scotland and into northern England.

 
Through extensive crossbreeding with local mares, these stallions spread the Clydesdale type throughout the areas where they were placed, and by 1840, Scottish draught horses and the Clydesdale were one and the same. In 1877, the Clydesdale Horse Society of Scotland was formed, followed in 1879 by the American Clydesdale Association (later renamed the Clydesdale Breeders of the USA), which served both U.S. and Canadian breed enthusiasts. The first American stud book was published in 1882. In 1883, the short-lived Select Clydesdale Horse Society was founded to compete with the Clydesdale Horse Society. It was started by two breeders dedicated to improving the breed, who also were responsible in large part for the introduction of Shire blood into the Clydesdale.

Large numbers of Clydesdales were exported from Scotland in the late nineteenth and early twentieth centuries, with 1617 stallions leaving the country in 1911 alone. Between 1884 and 1945, export certificates were issued for 20,183 horses. These horses were exported to other countries in the British Empire, as well as North and South America, continental Europe, and Russia.

The First World War had the conscription of thousands of horses for the war effort, and after the war, breed numbers declined as farms became increasingly mechanised. This decline continued between the wars.  Following the Second World War, the number of Clydesdale breeding stallions in England dropped from more than 200 in 1946 to 80 in 1949. By 1975, the Rare Breeds Survival Trust considered them vulnerable to extinction, meaning fewer than 900 breeding females remained in the UK.

Many of the horses exported from Scotland in the nineteenth and twentieth centuries went to Australia and New Zealand. In 1918, the Commonwealth Clydesdale Horse Society was formed as the association for the breed in Australia. Between 1906 and 1936, Clydesdales were bred so extensively in Australia that other draught breeds were almost unknown. By the late 1960s, it was noted that "Excellent Clydesdale horses are bred in Victoria and New Zealand; but, at least in the former place, it is considered advisable to keep up the type by frequent importations from England." Over 25,000 Clydesdales were registered in Australia between 1924 and 2008. The popularity of the Clydesdale led to it being called "the breed that built Australia".

In the 1990s numbers began to rise. By 2005, the Rare Breeds Survival Trust had moved the breed to "at risk" status, meaning that there were fewer than 1500 breeding females in the UK. By 2010 it had been moved back to "vulnerable". In 2010 the Clydesdale was listed as "watch" by the American Livestock Breeds Conservancy, meaning that fewer than 2500 horses were registered annually in the USA, and there were fewer than 10,000 worldwide. In 2010 the worldwide population was estimated to be 5000, with around 4000 in the US and Canada, 800 in the UK, and the rest in other countries, including Russia, Japan, Germany, and South Africa.

Characteristics 

The conformation of the Clydesdale has changed greatly throughout its history. In the 1920s and 1930s, it was a compact horse smaller than the Shire, Percheron, and Belgian Draught. Beginning in the 1940s, breeding animals were selected to produce taller horses that looked more impressive in parades and shows. The breed has a straight or slightly convex facial profile, broad forehead, and wide muzzle.

It is well-muscled and strong, with an arched neck, high withers, and a sloped shoulder. Breed associations pay close attention to the quality of the hooves and legs, as well as the general movement. Their gaits are active, with clearly lifted hooves and a general impression of power and quality. Clydesdales are energetic, with a manner described by the Clydesdale Horse Society as a "gaiety of carriage and outlook".

Clydesdales have been identified to be at risk for chronic progressive lymphedema, a disease with clinical signs that include progressive swelling, hyperkeratosis, and fibrosis of distal limbs that is similar to chronic lymphedema in humans. Another health concern is a skin condition on the lower leg where feathering is heavy. Colloquially called "Clyde's itch", it is thought to be caused by a type of mange. Clydesdales are also known to develop sunburn on any pink (unpigmented) skin around their faces.

Clydesdales are usually bay in colour, but a Sabino like pattern (currently an untestable KIT mutation), black, grey, and chestnut also occur. Most have white markings, including white on the face, feet, and legs, and occasional body spotting (generally on the lower belly).  They also have extensive feathering on their lower legs.  Sabino like ticking, body spotting, and extensive white markings are thought to be the result of sabino genetics. Some Clydesdale breeders want white face and leg markings without the spotting on the body.

To attempt getting the ideal set of markings, they often breed horses with only one white leg to horses with four white legs and sabino ticking on their bodies. On average, the result is a foal with the desired amount of white markings. Clydesdales do not have the Sabino 1 (SB1) gene responsible for causing sabino expressions in many other breeds, and researchers theorise that several other genes are responsible for these patterns.

Many buyers pay a premium for bay and black horses, especially those with four white legs and white facial markings. Specific colours are often preferred over other physical traits, and some buyers even choose horses with soundness problems if they have the desired colour and markings. Sabino like horses are not preferred by buyers, despite one draught-breed writer theorising that they are needed to keep the desired coat colours and texture. Breed associations, however, state that no colour is bad, and that horses with roaning and body spots are increasingly accepted.

Uses

The Clydesdale was originally used for agriculture, hauling coal in Lanarkshire, and heavy hauling in Glasgow. Today, Clydesdales are still used for draught purposes, including agriculture, logging, and driving. They are also shown and ridden, as well as kept for pleasure. Clydesdales are known to be the popular breed choice with carriage services and parade horses because of their white, feathery feet.

Along with carriage horses, Clydesdales are also used as show horses. They are shown in lead line and harness classes at county and state fairs, as well as national exhibitions. 
Some of the most famous members of the breed are the teams that make up the hitches of the Budweiser Clydesdales. These horses were first owned by the Budweiser Brewery at the end of Prohibition in the United States, and have since become an international symbol of both the breed and the brand. The Budweiser breeding programme, with its strict standards of colour and conformation, have influenced the look of the breed in the United States to the point that many people believe that Clydesdales are always bay with white markings.

Some Clydesdales are used for riding and can be shown under saddle, as well as being driven. Due to their calm disposition, they have proven to be very easy to train and capable of making exceptional trail horses. Clydesdales and Shires are used by the British Household Cavalry as drum horses, leading parades on ceremonial and state occasions. The horses are eye-catching colours, including piebald, skewbald, and roan. They carry the Musical Ride Officer and two silver drums weighing  each.

In the late nineteenth century, Clydesdale blood was added to the Irish Draught breed in an attempt to improve and reinvigorate that declining breed. However, these efforts were not seen as successful, as Irish Draught breeders thought the Clydesdale blood made their horses coarser and prone to lower leg faults. The Clydesdale contributed to the development of the Gypsy Horse in Great Britain. The Clydesdale, along with other draught breeds, was also used to create the Australian Draught Horse. In the early twentieth century, they were often crossed with Dales Ponies, creating mid-sized draught horses useful for pulling commercial wagons and military artillery.

References

Further reading

External links
The Clydesdale Horse Society
Clydesdale Breeders of the USA
Commonwealth Clydesdale Horse Society
Clydesdale Horse Association of Canada

Horse breeds originating in Scotland
Horse breeds
South Lanarkshire
Conservation Priority Breeds of the Livestock Conservancy
Animal breeds on the RBST Watchlist